This is a list of full generals in the British Army since the Acts of Union 1707. The rank of general (or full general to distinguish it from the lower general officer ranks) is the highest rank currently achievable by serving officers in the British Army. It ranks above lieutenant-general and below field marshal which is now only awarded as an honorary rank. The annotation "Held rank in the East Indies." indicates that the officer served in India in the East India Company's army.

This list is incomplete after 1876; you can help by expanding it.

See also
List of British generals and brigadiers (covers all ranks from brigadier (and brigadier-general) to field marshal)
List of Royal Marines full generals (the equivalent ranked officers in the Royal Marines)
List of field marshals of the British Army
List of Royal Air Force air chief marshals (the equivalent ranked officers in the RAF)
List of Royal Navy admirals (the equivalent ranked officers in the RN)

References

Generals
British generals
 *
Generals